Mark Clode (born 24 February 1973) is an English former footballer who played in the Football League for Plymouth Argyle and Swansea City. Whilst at Swansea he was a part of the team that won after a penalty shootout in the 1994 Football League Trophy Final.

References

External links
 

English footballers
English Football League players
Plymouth Argyle F.C. players
Swansea City A.F.C. players
Bath City F.C. players
1973 births
Living people
Association football fullbacks